O'Hare is a Chicago "L" station located at O'Hare International Airport, 17 miles (27 km) northwest of The Loop. The northwestern terminus of the Chicago Transit Authority's Blue Line, it is a subway station with two island platforms serving three tracks, situated under the parking garage for Terminals 1, 2, and 3. Trains are scheduled to depart from O'Hare every 2–7 minutes during rush-hour periods and take about 40 minutes to travel to the Loop. It is the westernmost station of the Chicago 'L' system. It is also the only station without coordinates in Chicago's grid system, the only underground terminus, and is the only terminal that does not directly connect to any CTA or Pace buses.

History

O'Hare station opened on September 3, 1984, as the terminus of an extension of the West-Northwest route from its former terminal at River Road. It was built to a design by the architectural firm Murphy/Jahn.

Introduction of premium fare
For the first 28 years of O'Hare station's operations, the fare passengers paid the same fare to enter it as they would at any other "L" station. The premium fare was imposed on O'Hare passengers in 2013; first (in January 2013), only passengers buying single-ride tickets had to pay the surcharge; by July of the same year, the surcharge was imposed on most other passengers (those using Ventra or a Ventra Card Plus) as well.

Accident

On March 24, 2014, a train approaching the station on the middle track collided with the bumper, then jumped the tracks and crashed into the escalators, injuring 32 people. The station reopened on March 30, 2014, at 2:00 p.m.

Architecture

The station was designed by Helmut Jahn of Murphy/Jahn in the distinctive Postmodernism style. The column-free platform is paved with concrete and the walls are constructed of wavy glass block with backlighting. The mezzanine is designed to mimic an airplane fuselage.

Bus and rail connections
Take Airport Transit System to the Multi-Modal Facility (MMF) Stop to access connections

Airport Transit System

 To Terminals 1, 2, 3, 5, and Multi-Modal Facility

Metra
 North Central Service at O’Hare Transfer Station (via the Airport Transit System to Multi-Modal Facility)

Pace
  250 Dempster Street 
  330 Mannheim/LaGrange Roads

References

External links 

 Train schedule (PDF) at CTA official site

CTA Blue Line stations
Chicago "L" terminal stations
Airport railway stations in the United States
Railway stations in the United States opened in 1984
O'Hare International Airport
1984 establishments in Illinois